Roberto de Oliveira  also known as Roberto Oliveira (born 16 December 1980) is a Brazilian footballer. He played as a midfielder for clubs in Brazil, Portugal, Peru and El Salvador.

References

External links
http://www.elgrafico.com/balboa/player/7/356.html

1980 births
Living people
Brazilian footballers
Association football midfielders
Sociedade Esportiva Palmeiras players
CR Vasco da Gama players
Rio Claro Futebol Clube players
Atlético Balboa footballers
Brazilian expatriate footballers
Brazilian expatriate sportspeople in El Salvador
Expatriate footballers in El Salvador
Brazilian expatriate sportspeople in Peru
Expatriate footballers in Peru
Brazilian expatriate sportspeople in Portugal
Expatriate footballers in Portugal